Caelius Aconius Probianus (fl. 461–471) was a politician of the Western Roman Empire.

He was Praetorian prefect of Italy under Emperors Leo I and Libius Severus; considering that his successor Caecina Decius Basilius was in office in 463, Probianus' mandate lasted between 461 and 463. In 471, he held the consulship, chosen by the Western court of Emperor Anthemius, together with Eastern Emperor Leo.

As attested by his name, he was related to the Aconii Catullini family, and, probably, to Aconia Fabia Paulina.

Notes

Bibliography 
 Martindale, John Robert, "Probianus 4", The Prosopography of the Later Roman Empire,  Cambridge University Press, 1980, p. 908.

5th-century Romans
5th-century Roman consuls
Imperial Roman consuls
Praetorian prefects of Italy
Year of death unknown
Year of birth unknown